A fifteenth is a music interval of two octaves.

Fifteenth or 15th may also refer to
 15th in a sequence

History
 Fifteenth (tax), medieval English tax
 Fifteenth Dynasty of Egypt, approximately 1650 to 1550 BC
 Fifteenth Amendment (disambiguation)

Geography
 15th Street (disambiguation)
 15th district (disambiguation)

Military
 15th Army (disambiguation)
 15th Division (disambiguation)

See also
 15 (disambiguation)